Philippiella may refer to:
 Philippiella (ostracod), a genus of ostracods in the family Cylindroleberididae
 Philippiella (plant), a genus of plants in the family Caryophyllaceae
 Philippiella, a genus of algae in the family Chordariaceae, synonym of Elachista
 Philippiella, a genus of bivalves in the family Philobryidae, synonym of Philobrya
 Philippiella, a fossil genus of bivalves in the family Terquemiidae, synonym of Newaagia